Samuel Irving Newhouse may refer to:

 Samuel Irving Newhouse, Sr. (1895–1979), publisher, founder of Advance Publications empire, which controls Condé Nast Publications
 Samuel Irving Newhouse, Jr. (1927-2017), nicknamed Si Newhouse, chairman and CEO of Advance Publications and chairman of Condé Nast
 Samuel Irving Newhouse IV, featured in the documentary Born Rich (2003)

See also
 Samuel Newhouse (1853 – 1930), Utah entrepreneur and mining magnate
 MV Samuel I. Newhouse, a boat in the Staten Island Ferry fleet